Mehdiabad-e Vahed (also Romanized as Mehdīābād-e Vāḩed; also known as Mehdīābād and Mihdīābād) is a village in Qasemabad Rural District, in the Central District of Rafsanjan County, Kerman Province, Iran. At the 2006 census, its population was 2,673, in 621 families.

References 

Populated places in Rafsanjan County